Esporte Clube Santo André, commonly referred to as simply Santo André, is a Brazilian association football club in Santo André, São Paulo. They currently play in the Série D, the fourth tier of Brazilian football, as well as in the Campeonato Paulista, São Paulo's premier state league.

Santo André greatest rival is São Caetano, the other team in ABC region. The club's mascot name is Ramalhão ("Big Ramalho") after João Ramalho, the bandeirante who founded the city of Santo André in 1553.

History

Santo André was founded on 18 September 1967, by people that wanted to have a team in their city representing the professional football of the Municipality.

The first Santo André directorship was elected on 4 October 1967, and was composed by the following members: Newton Brandão, the President; Wigand dos Santos, Antonio Ferreira dos Santos and Hildebrando Mota Carneiro, the vice-presidents; Nelson Cerchiari and Durval Daniel, secretaries; Matheus Guimarães Jr. and João Manha, the treasurers.

The first official match of the club took place on April 8, 1968, at Américo Guazzelli stadium in a friendly match against Santos. Pelé did not play, but watched the game and participated in the festivities. Santo André won 2 - 1.

In 1984 Santo André were invited to play in Série A based on their State Championship performance.  The team reached the third round (ranked 10th overall), but were not invited to compete the following year as the criteria changed.

Santo André next made headlines in 2003 when the team finished as runners-up to Ituano in Série C and thus were promoted to Série B.

In 2004, Santo André won their first national title when they defeated Flamengo in the Copa do Brasil final, gaining the right to compete in the following year's Copa Libertadores de América. Their first season in Série B was over before it started as the team was docked 12 points for playing an ineligible player. This meant at the time of the Copa do Brasil success their point tally on the local tournament was negative. The team recovered to comfortably avoid relegation.

In 2008 Santo André were runners-up to Corinthians in the Série B and thus earned promotion to Série A. After a hard-fought campaign Santo André were relegated back to Série B on the last day of the season.

The 2010 Paulista State Championship proved to be a highly successful campaign. The team finished second in the table behind Santos after a mid season seven match winning streak put them in a commanding position. In the playoffs Santo André overcame Grêmio Prudente, before facing the all conquering Santos team who had scored nearly 100 goals already in all competitions. The first game ended in a 3-2 victory for Santos despite Santo André having a man sent off.  The second match on 2 May 2010, proved to be an epic encounter as Santo André leveled the tie in the first minute, before being pegged back. A thrilling game finally ended 3-2 to Santo André (5-5 on aggregate) and saw three red cards given to Santos, and one to Santo André. Despite hitting the post twice, Santo André could not break down a professional Santos rear guard action. Santos thus won the title due to their superior overall record.

Santo André slipped into free fall and were relegated to Série C in 2010 and almost relegated to the Série D in 2011.

Achievements

Copa do Brasil: 1
2004

Brazilian Championship Serie B: 0
Runners-up (1): 2008

Brazilian Championship Serie C: 0
Runners-up (1): 2003

Copa FPF: 2
2003, 2014

Campeonato Paulista: 0
Runners-up (1): 2010

Campeonato Paulista Série A2: 5
1975, 1981, 2008, 2016, 2019

Copa São Paulo de Futebol Júnior: 1
2003

Squad

Out on loan

Former coaches
 A notable coach would be Sérgio Guedes.

Stadium

Santo André's stadium is Estádio Bruno José Daniel, inaugurated in 1969, with a maximum capacity of 18,000 people.

2004 Copa do Brasil

References

External links
   Official Web Site
  Fans Site

 
Association football clubs established in 1967
Santo Andre
1967 establishments in Brazil
Copa do Brasil winning clubs